Matteo Cincilla (born 24 October 1994) is an Italian professional footballer who plays as a goalkeeper.

Career
Born in Milan, Lombardy, Cincilla was a youth product of Inter.

In May 2012 Cincilla won Berretti league title with the Inter under-18 team. He was named in the squad of 2012–13 UEFA Europa League as List B players. In January 2013 Cincilla left for Parma.

On 5 July 2013 Cincilla (co-ownership), Antonio Santurro (loan), Davide Adorni (loan) and Filippo Lauricella (co-ownership) were transferred to Renate from Parma. Cincilla made his debut in 2013–14 Coppa Italia Lega Pro. He also played the next league cup match. Cincilla played his first game in 2013–14 Lega Pro Seconda Divisione on 19 January 2014. The club promoted to 2014–15 Lega Pro as the runner-up of Group A.

On 14 August 2015 Cincilla was signed by Savona in a 1-year deal.

In the summer of 2016 Cincilla returned to Renate.

On 15 July 2019, he signed a 2-year contract with Ravenna.

Honours
Inter U18
 Campionato Nazionale Dante Berretti: 2012

Inter U19
 Campionato Nazionale Primavera: 2012
 NextGen series: 2012

References

External links
 

Italian footballers
Inter Milan players
Parma Calcio 1913 players
A.C. Renate players
Ravenna F.C. players
Serie C players
Association football goalkeepers
Footballers from Milan
1994 births
Living people